Clifford Roland Dapper (January 2, 1920 – February 8, 2011) was a Major League Baseball catcher who played for the Brooklyn Dodgers during the 1942 season.
 
Born in Los Angeles, Dapper began his baseball career at age 18 for the Class-B Bellingham Chinooks in the Western International League.  With many players unavailable due to World War II, Dapper got his shot at the majors in April 1942, appearing in eight games for Brooklyn. He recorded eight hits in 17 at-bats for a .471 batting average, including a home run, one double, two runs and nine RBI. Despite his hot hitting, Dapper was unable to dislodge all-star Mickey Owen from the catcher's position for the Dodgers, and he was returned to the minors. Later that season he was drafted into the US Navy, and missed the 1943–45 seasons while serving in the South Pacific during World War II.

Following his military discharge, Dapper returned to baseball as a player and then manager, helming Pittsburgh Pirates farm clubs in Eugene, Oregon, and Billings, Montana, all while still an active player. He eventually played 1,623 minor-league games over a twenty-year span, hitting .274 and 102 homers before retiring in 1957, the same year that his former team, the Brooklyn Dodgers, moved to his home town of Los Angeles.

Traded for Ernie Harwell
Dapper held the unique distinction of having been traded for an announcer. In 1948, Dapper, then with the Dodgers' top farm club, the Class-AAA Montreal Royals of the International League, was sent to the then-unaffiliated Class AA Atlanta Crackers of the Southern Association—the Dodgers' GM Branch Rickey wanted Ernie Harwell to substitute for ailing Dodger broadcaster Red Barber, and the Crackers' president Earl Mann wanted a player in return. Dapper batted .280 in 115 games and managed the Crackers in 1949.

While Dapper returned to the Dodgers organization the following year, playing for another Brooklyn-affiliated AAA team—the Hollywood Stars of the Pacific Coast League—in 1950, Harwell left the Dodgers after the 1949 season, broadcasting the New York Giants and Baltimore Orioles through the 1950s before spending the next 42 years with the Detroit Tigers.  Harwell and Dapper would not meet for over half a century, until Dapper came to Comerica Park on September 15, 2002, when Harwell's statue at the Tigers' home was unveiled.

After Baseball
Following his baseball career, Dapper settled in Fallbrook, California, buying a ranch alongside former Dodgers teammate Duke Snider where they made a substantial living farming avocados and lemons on 60 acres.  Dapper became president of the California Avocado Growers Council.

Dapper and his wife Stanna, who had been high school classmates and married in 1944, raised three sons—all catchers—and a daughter in Fallbrook.  Stanna died in 2008, after which Dapper moved to an assisted living facility in Fallbrook, where he died at the age of 91 in 2011.  Dapper and his wife are buried together at Riverside National Cemetery.  In addition to their four children, they were survived by 13 grandchildren and 2 great-grandchildren.

References

External links

 Retrosheet

1920 births
2011 deaths
Major League Baseball catchers
Brooklyn Dodgers players
Atlanta Crackers managers
Atlanta Crackers players
Bellingham Chinooks players
Billings Mustangs managers
Billings Mustangs players
Eugene Emeralds players
Eugene Emeralds managers
Eugene Larks players
Hollywood Stars players
Mobile Bears players
Montreal Royals players
St. Paul Saints (AA) players
Salt Lake City Bees players
United States Navy personnel of World War II
Baseball players from Los Angeles
People from Fallbrook, California
United States Navy sailors